John Edwin Luecke is an American mathematician who works in topology and knot theory.  He got his Ph.D. in 1985 from the University of Texas at Austin and is now a professor in the department of mathematics at that institution.

Work
Luecke specializes in  knot theory and 3-manifolds. In a 1987 paper Luecke, Marc Culler, Cameron Gordon, and Peter Shalen proved the cyclic surgery theorem.  In a 1989 paper Luecke and Cameron Gordon proved that knots are determined by their complements, a result now known as the Gordon–Luecke theorem.

Dr Luecke received a NSF Presidential Young Investigator Award in 1992 and Sloan Foundation fellow in 1994. In 2012 he became a fellow of the American Mathematical Society.

References

External links
 John Edwin Luecke at the Mathematics Genealogy Project
 Luecke's home page at the University of Texas at Austin

20th-century American mathematicians
21st-century American mathematicians
Topologists
University of Texas at Austin faculty
University of Texas at Austin College of Natural Sciences alumni
Fellows of the American Mathematical Society
Living people
Year of birth missing (living people)